Blois is the capital of Loir-et-Cher department in central France.

Blois may also refer to:

 Blois family, major landowners in Suffolk
 Blois Football 41, a French football club

Surname
Blois baronets
Charles Blois (disambiguation)